"Mr. Bobby" is the last single from Manu Chao's second album, Próxima Estación: Esperanza. Originally, the song was released in a stripped-down form without any wind instruments on the "Bongo Bong" single in 1998. The song, which is a tribute to reggae legend Bob Marley, had success in European countries such as Spain, Italy and Switzerland. During live performances, Manu Chao's band performs the "Politik Kills" version as it is more reggae-influenced than the album version (which has the same backing track as "Bongo Bong").

Track listing
 "Mr. Bobby" (Politik Kills)
 "Mr. Bobby" (Wyskyfacile)
 "Mr. Bobby"

Music video
A music video directed by Run Wrake was produced for the song. Like most of Manu Chao's videos at the time, it is mostly animated except for the singer.

Charts

Covers
American musician B.o.B recorded a cover of the song, with original lyrics, which can be found on his fifth mixtape, B.o.B vs. Bobby Ray (2009).

References

1998 songs
2002 singles
Manu Chao songs